Zanna Proniadou (born ) is a Greek volleyball player. She was part of the Greece women's national volleyball team. 

She competed with the Greek national team at the 2004 Summer Olympics in Athens, Greece. On club level she played with Filathlitikos Thessaloniki in 2002 and with Filathlitikos in 2004.

Clubs
 Filathlitikos Thessaloniki (2002)
  Filathlitikos (2004)

References

External links

1978 births
Living people
Greek women's volleyball players
Place of birth missing (living people)
Volleyball players at the 2004 Summer Olympics
Olympic volleyball players of Greece
Middle blockers
Sportspeople from Saratov
21st-century Greek women